This is a list of South Korean male television, film, musical, theatre and voice actors who are active in South Korea. Names are listed as stage name.

A

 Ahn Bo-hyun
 Ahn Do-gyu
 Ahn Dong-goo 
 Ahn Gil-kang
 Ahn Hyo-seop
 Ahn Jae-hong
 Ahn Jae-hwan
 Ahn Jae-hyun
 Ahn Jae-mo
 Ahn Jae-wook
 Ahn Ji-ho
 Ahn Ji-hwan
 Ahn Nae-sang
 Ahn Se-ha
 Ahn Seung-gyun 
 Ahn Suk-hwan
 Ahn Sung-ki
 Ahn Woo-yeon
 Ahn Yong-joon
 Ajoo
 Alex Chu
 Alexander Lee
 Allen Kim
 An Jang-hyeok
 An Jong-deok
 Andy Lee

B 

 B-Bomb
 Bae Eun-sik
 Bae Hyun-sung
 Bae In-hyuk
 Bae Jin-young
 Bae Ki-sung
 Bae Seong-woo
 Bae Soo-bin
 Bae Yong-joon
 Baek Bong-ki
 Baek Chul-min 
 Baek Il-seob
 Baek Min-hyun
 Baek Seung-hyeon
 Baek Su-ho
 Baek Sung-hyun
 Baek Yoon-sik
 Baekho 
 Baekhyun 
 Bak Il
 Bak Tae-ho
 Bang Jae-ho
 Bang Seong-joon
 Bang Yong-guk
 Baro
 Bobby Lee
 Bong Man-dae
 Bong Tae-gyu
 Boom 
 Brian Joo
 Byeon Woo-seok
 Byun Hee-bong
 Byun Yo-han
 Byung Hun

C 

 Casanova Wong
 Cha Do-jin
 Cha Eun-woo
 Cha In-ha
 Cha In-pyo
 Cha Seo-won
 Cha Seung-won
 Cha Seung-woo
 Cha Tae-hyun
 Chae Jong-hyeop
 Chae Sang-woo
 Chang Kiha
 Changjo
 Changmin 
 Chen 
 Cho Jae-hyun
 Cho Jin-woong
 Cho Jung-rae
 Cho Kyu-hyun
 Cho Seung-woo
 Cho Yeon-woo
 Cho Yoon-woo
 Choi Bo-min
 Choi Bool-am
 Choi Byung-chan
 Choi Byung-mo
 Choi Cheol-ho
 Choi Dae-chul 
 Choi Dae-sung
 Choi Daniel
 Choi Deok-moon
 Choi Gwi-hwa
 Choi Go
 Choi Han
 Choi Il-hwa
 Choi Jae-sung
 Choi Ji-ho
 Choi Jin-ho
 Choi Jin-hyuk
 Choi Jin-young
 Choi Jong-hoon
 Choi Jong-hwan
 Choi Jong-won
 Choi Jung-won
 Choi Jung-woo
 Choi Jung-woo 
 Choi Kwon
 Choi Kwon-soo
 Choi Kyu-jin 
 Choi Min
 Choi Min-chul
 Choi Min-ho
 Choi Min-hwan
 Choi Min-sik
 Choi Min-soo
 Choi Min-yong
 Choi Min-young
 Choi Moo-ryong
 Choi Moo-sung
 Choi Phillip
 Choi Ro-woon
 Choi Seung-hoon
 Choi Si-won 
 Choi Soo-jong
 Choi Sung-jae
 Choi Sung-kook
 Choi Sung-min
 Choi Sung-won
 Choi Tae-hwan
 Choi Tae-joon
 Choi Won-hong
 Choi Won-hyeong
 Choi Won-young
 Choi Woo-hyuk
 Choi Woo-hyuk
 Choi Woo-shik
 Choi Woong
 Choi Young-jae
 Choi Young-joon
 Chu Song-woong
 Chun Bo-geun
 Chun Ho-jin
 Chun Jung-myung
 CNU

D 

 D.O. 
 Daesung
 Daniel Dae Kim
 Daniel Henney
 Danny Ahn
 David Chung
 David Lee McInnis
 Defconn
 Dennis Oh
 DinDin 
 Do Ji-han
 Do Sang-woo
 Dokgo Young-jae
 Dong Ha
 Doyoung
 Dragon Lee

E 

 Eagle Han-ying
 Eli Kim
 Elton Chong
 Eric Mun
 Eru
 Eun Ji-won
 Eun Won-jae
 Eunhyuk

G 

 G.O
 Gang Dong-won
 Gi Ju-bong
 Go Geon-han 
 Go Joo-won
 Go Jun
 Go Kyung-pyo
 Go Se-won
 Go Soo
 Go Yoon
 Gong Hyung-jin
 Gong Myung
 Gong Yoo
 Gongchan
 Goo Seung-hyun
 Gree
 Gu Bon-seung
 Gu Won

H 

 Ha Do-kwon 
 Ha Jun
 Ha Jung-woo
 Ha Seok-jin
 Hah Myung-joong
 Haha
 Han Do-woo
 Han Hee-jun
 Han Hyun-min 
 Han Jae-suk
 Han Ji-sang
 Han Jin-hee
 Han Joo-wan
 Han Joon-woo 
 Han Jung-soo
 Han Ki-woong
 Han Kyoo-hee
 Han Sang-hyeok
 Han Sang-jin
 Han Seung-woo
 Han Suk-joon
 Han Suk-kyu
 Heo Jang-kang
 Heo Jung-min
 Heo Sung-tae
 Heo Young-saeng 
 Hong Jong-hyun
 Hong Kwang-ho
 Hong Kyung
 Hong Kyung-min
 Hong Seok-cheon
 Hong Seok-jae
 Hong Yo-seob
 Hongseok
 Hoya
 Huh Joon-ho
 Hwang Chan-sung
 Hwang Hee
 Hwang In-youp 
 Hwang Jang-lee
 Hwang Jung-min
 Hwang Kwang-hee
 Hwang Min-hyun
 Hwang Min-woo 
 Hwanhee
 Hyuk 
 Hyun Bin
 Hyun Woo
 Hyun Woo-sung
 Hyungwon

I 

 Im Chae-moo
 Im Chang-jung
 Im Ha-ryong
 Im Ho
 Im Hyuk
 Im Hyun-sik
 Im Hyung-joon
 Im Ji-kyu
 Im Kang-sung 
 Im Si-wan 
 Im Tae-kyung
 Im Won-hee
 In Gyo-jin

J 

 Jae Hee
 Jae Park
 Jaehyun 
 Jang Do-yoon
 Jang Dong-gun
 Jang Dong-joo 
 Jang Dong-min
 Jang Dong-woo
 Jang Dong-yoon
 Jang Eui-soo 
 Jang Gwang
 Jang Han-byul 
 Jang Hang-jun
 Jang Hang-sun
 Jang Hyuk
 Jang Hyuk-jin
 Jang Hyun-sung
 Jang In-sub
 Jang Jin
 Jang Joon-hwan
 Jang Keun-suk
 Jang Ki-bum
 Jang Ki-yong
 Jang Mi-kwan
 Jang Min-hyeok
 Jang Seung-jo
 Jang Su-won
 Jang Tae-sung
 Jang Woo-hyuk
 Jang Wooyoung 
 Jang Yong
 Jang Yoo-sang 
 Jasper Cho 
 Jay
 Jay B 
 Jeon Bae-soo
 Jeon Ji-hoo 
 Jeon Jun-hyeok
 Jeon Moo-song
 Jeon No-min
 Jeon Seok-ho
 Jeon Sung-woo 
 Jeong Bo-seok
 Jeong Jae-heon
 Jeong Jin-hwan
 Jeong Jinwoon
 Jeong Jun-ha
 Jeong Se-woon
 Jeong Yeong-wung
 Ji Chang-wook
 Ji Eun-sung
 Ji Hyun-woo
 Ji Il-joo
 Ji Jin-hee
 Ji Min-hyuk
 Ji Sang-ryeol
 Ji Seung-hyun
 Ji Soo
 Ji Sung
 Ji Yoon-ho
 Jin Goo
 Jin Ju-hyung
 Jin Seon-kyu 
 Jin Tae-hyun
 Jin Yi-han
 Jinho 
 Jinjin
 Jinyoung 
 JK Kim Dong-wook
 Jo Byeong-kyu
 Jo Dong-hyuk
 Jo Han-sun
 Jo Hee-bong
 Jo Hyun-jae
 Jo Hyun-sik
 Jo Jae-yoon
 Jo Jung-chi
 Jo Jung-suk
 Jo Kwan-woo
 Jo Kwang-min 
 Jo Kwon
 Jo Min-ki
 Jo Se-ho
 Jo Sung-ha
 Jo Sung-mo
 Jo Woo-jin
 Jo Ye-sin
 Jo Young-min 
 John Cho
 Joo Hyun
 Joo Jin-mo
 Joo Jin-mo
 Joo Jong-hyuk
 Joo Jong-hyuk
 Joo Sang-wook
 Joo Won
 Joo Woo-jae
 Joon Park
 JR
 Ju Ji-hoon
 Julien Kang
 Jun Chong
 Jun Jin
 Jun Kwang-ryul
 Jun Tae-soo
 Jun. K
 Jun.Q
 Jun-seong Kim
 Jung Chan
 Jung Chan-woo
 Jung Chan-woo
 Jung Dae-hyun
 Jung Dong-ha
 Jung Dong-hwan
 Jung Doo-hong
 Jung Eui-chul
 Jung Eun-pyo
 Jung Eun-woo
 Jung Ga-ram
 Jung Gun-joo
 Jung Gyu-woon
 Jung Hae-in
 Jung Hae-kyun 
 Jung Han-yong
 Jung Hee-tae
 Jung Ho-keun
 Jung Hyeon-jun 
 Jung Hyung-don
 Jung Il-hoon 
 Jung Il-woo
 Jung In-gi
 Jung Jae-kwang
 Jung Jae-young
 Jung Jin-young
 Jung Jin-young
 Jung Joon
 Jung Joon-ho
 Jung Joon-won
 Jung Joon-won
 Jung Joon-young
 Jung Kyung-ho
 Jung Kyung-ho
 Jung Man-sik
 Jung Sang-hoon
 Jung Suk-won
 Jung Sung-hwa
 Jung Tae-woo
 Jung Woo
 Jung Woo-sung
 Jung Woong-in
 Jung Yong-hwa 
 Jung Yoon-hak 
 Jung Yoon-seok
 Juno

K 

 K.Will
 Kai
 Kai
 Kam Woo-sung
 Kang Chan-hee
 Kang Daniel 
 Kang Doo
 Kang Eui-sik
 Kang Eun-tak
 Kang Ha-neul
 Kang Han-byeol
 Kang Hong-seok 
 Kang Hui 
 Kang In-soo
 Kang Ji-hwan
 Kang Ji-sub
 Kang Ki-doong 
 Kang Ki-young
 Kang Kyung-joon
 Kang Min-hyuk
 Kang Nam-gil
 Kang Seok-woo
 Kang Seung-yoon
 Kang Shin-hyo
 Kang Shin-il
 Kang Soo-jin
 Kang Suk-jung
 Kang Sung-hoon
 Kang Sung-jin
 Kang Tae-oh
 Kang Yi-seok
 Kang Yu-chan
 Kangin
 Kangnam
 Kangta
 Kelvin Han Yee
 Ken
 Kevin Woo
 Key
 Ki Hong Lee
 Ki Tae-young
 Kil Yong-woo
 Kim Ah-yeong
 Kim Bo-sung
 Kim Bum
 Kim Byeong-ok
 Kim Byung-chul
 Kim Byung-ki
 Kim Byung-man
 Kim Byung-se
 Kim C
 Kim Chang-wan
 Kim Da-hyun
 Kim Dae-gon 
 Kim Dae-jin
 Kim Dae-myung
 Kim Dong-beom
 Kim Dong-hee
 Kim Dong-ho
 Kim Dong-hyun 
 Kim Dong-hyun
 Kim Dong-jun
 Kim Dong-wan
 Kim Dong-wook
 Kim Dong-young
 Kim Eui-sung
 Kim Eung-soo
 Kim Geon-won
 Kim Gu-ra
 Kim Hee-chan
 Kim Hee-chul
 Kim Hee-ra
 Kim Hee-won
 Kim Heung-gook
 Kim Heung-soo
 Kim Ho-jin
 Kim Ho-seong
 Kim Hye-seong
 Kim Hyun-joong
 Kim Hyun-mok 
 Kim Hyung-jun
 Kim Ian
 Kim Il-woo
 Kim Il-woo
 Kim In-kwon
 Kim Jae-duck
 Kim Jae-hyun
 Kim Jae-joong
 Kim Jae-wook
 Kim Jae-yong 
 Kim Jae-young
 Kim Jaewon
 Kim Jeong-hoon
 Kim Ji-hoon
 Kim Ji-hoon
 Kim Ji-hoon
 Kim Ji-seok
 Kim Ji-soo
 Kim Jin-kyu
 Kim Jin-pyo
 Kim Jin-seong
 Kim Jin-tae
 Kim Jin-woo
 Kim Jin-woo
 Kim Jong-kook
 Kim Jong-min
 Kim Jong-seo
 Kim Jong-soo 
 Kim Joo-hun 
 Kim Joo-hyuk
 Kim Joon
 Kim Jun-han
 Kim Jun-ho
 Kim Jun-hyun
 Kim Jung-heon
 Kim Jung-hyun
 Kim Jung-hyun
 Kim Jung-min
 Kim Jung-tae
 Kim Junsu
 Kim Kang-hoon
 Kim Kang-min
 Kim Kang-woo
 Kim Kap-soo
 Kim Ki-bang
 Kim Ki-bum
 Kim Ki-duk
 Kim Ki-hyeon
 Kim Kiri
 Kim Kwang-kyu
 Kim Kwon
 Kim Kyu-chul
 Kim Kyu-jong
 Kim Kyung-nam
 Kim Min-gwi
 Kim Min-jae
 Kim Min-jae
 Kim Min-jong
 Kim Min-jun
 Kim Min-kyo
 Kim Min-kyu
 Kim Min-kyu
 Kim Min-seok
 Kim Mu-saeng
 Kim Mu-yeol
 Kim Myung-gon
 Kim Myung-min
 Kim Nam-gil
 Kim Nam-hee 
 Kim Nam-jin
 Kim Rae-won
 Kim Roi-ha
 Kim Ryeo-wook
 Kim San-ho
 Kim Sang-ho
 Kim Sang-jin
 Kim Sang-joong
 Kim Sang-kyung
 Kim Se-yong
 Kim Seok
 Kim Seon-ho
 Kim Seung-ho
 Kim Seung-jun
 Kim Seung-soo
 Kim Seung-woo
 Kim Si-hoo
 Kim So-hyeong
 Kim Soo-hyun
 Kim Soo-ro
 Kim Su-hyeon
 Kim Suk-hoon
 Kim Sun-woong 
 Kim Sung-cheol
 Kim Sung-joo
 Kim Sung-kyu
 Kim Sung-kyu
 Kim Sung-kyun
 Kim Sung-min
 Kim Sung-oh
 Kim Sung-soo
 Kim Tae-gyun
 Kim Tae-hoon
 Kim Tae-hwan
 Kim Tae-woo
 Kim Tae-woo
 Kim Tai-chung
 Kim Won-hae
 Kim Won-jun
 Kim Woo-bin
 Kim Woo-seok
 Kim Woo-seok
 Kim Yeon-woo
 Kim Yeong-cheol
 Kim Yo-han 
 Kim Yong-gun
 Kim Yong-hee
 Kim Yong-joon
 Kim Yong-man
 Kim Yool-ho
 Kim Yoon-seok
 Kim Young-chul 
 Kim Young-dae
 Kim Young-ho
 Kim Young-jae
 Kim Young-jae
 Kim Young-hoon
 Kim Young-kwang
 Kim Young-sik
 Kim Youngsun
 Kim Yu-seok
 Ko Chang-seok
 Ko Ji-yong
 Ko Kyu-pil
 Ko Seong-il
 Koo Ja-sung
 Koo Jun-hoe
 Koo Jun-yup
 Koo Kyo-hwan
 Kwak Do-won
 Kwak Dong-yeon
 Kwak Hee-sung
 Kwak Jung-wook
 Kwak Si-yang
 Kwon Hae-hyo
 Kwon Hwa-woon 
 Kwon Hyeok-soo
 Kwon Hyuk 
 Kwon Hyuk-soo
 Kwon Hyun-bin
 Kwon Hyun-sang
 Kwon Oh-joong
 Kwon Sang-woo
 Kwon Soo-hyun
 Kwon Yul

L 

 L
 Lanny Joon
 Lee Beom-soo
 Lee Byung-hun
 Lee Byung-joon
 Lee Chang-hoon
 Lee Chang-min
 Lee Chang-sub
 Lee Chang-wook
 Lee Charm
 Lee Chun-hee
 Lee Dae-hwi
 Lee Dae-yeon
 Lee David
 Lee Deok-hwa
 Lee Do-gyeom
 Lee Do-hyun
 Lee Don-ku
 Lee Dong-gun
 Lee Dong-hwi
 Lee Dong-wook
 Lee Donghae
 Lee Eon
 Lee Eun-hyung
 Lee Eun-sang
 Lee Ga-sub
 Lee Geung-young
 Lee Gi-kwang
 Lee Gun-woo
 Lee Ha-yool
 Lee Hak-joo
 Lee Han-wi
 Lee Hee-joon
 Lee Hong-bin
 Lee Hong-gi
 Lee Hoon
 Lee Hwi-jae
 Lee Hyo-jung
 Lee Hyun-jae
 Lee Hyun-jin
 Lee Hyun-seung
 Lee Hyun-woo
 Lee Hyun-woo
 Lee Hyun-wook
 Lee Hyung-chul
 Lee Hyung-suk
 Lee In
 Lee In-sung
 Lee Jae-jin
 Lee Jae-joon
 Lee Jae-ryong
 Lee Jae-woo
 Lee Jae-wook
 Lee Jae-yong
 Lee Jae-yoon
 Lee Jai-jin
 Lee Jang-woo
 Lee Je-hoon
 Lee Ji-hoon
 Lee Ji-hoon
 Lee Jin-hyuk
 Lee Jin-kwon
 Lee Jin-woo
 Lee Jin-wook
 Lee Jong-hwa
 Lee Jong-hyuk
 Lee Jong-hyun
 Lee Jong-soo
 Lee Jong-suk
 Lee Jong-won
 Lee Jong-won
 Lee Joo-seung
 Lee Joon
 Lee Joon-gi
 Lee Joon-hyuk
 Lee Joon-woo
 Lee Joong-ok
 Lee Juck
 Lee Jun-ho
 Lee Jun-hyeok
 Lee Jun-young
 Lee Jung
 Lee Jung-gil
 Lee Jung-ha
 Lee Jung-hyuk
 Lee Jung-jae
 Lee Jung-jin
 Lee Jung-shik
 Lee Jung-shin
 Lee Kang-min
 Lee Ki-chan
 Lee Ki-hyuk
 Lee Ki-seop
 Lee Ki-woo
 Lee Ki-young
 Lee Kwang-soo
 Lee Kye-in
 Lee Kyu-han
 Lee Kyu-hyung
 Lee Kyung-kyu
 Lee Min-ho
 Lee Min-hyuk
 Lee Min-ki
 Lee Min-woo
 Lee Min-woo
 Lee Moon-sik
 Lee Myung-hoon
 Lee Nak-hoon
 Lee Phillip
 Lee Pil-mo
 Lee Sang-hyun
 Lee Sang-min
 Lee Sang-woo
 Lee Sang-woo
 Lee Sang-yeob
 Lee Sang-yi
 Lee Sang-yoon
 Lee Seo-jin
 Lee Seo-won
 Lee Seon-ho
 Lee Seung-chul
 Lee Seung-gi
 Lee Seung-ho
 Lee Seung-hyo
 Lee Seung-hyub
 Lee Seung-hyung
 Lee Seung-joon
 Lee Seung-joon
 Lee Seung-wook
 Lee Shin-young
 Lee Si-eon
 Lee Si-woo
 Lee Soo-geun
 Lee Soo-hyuk
 Lee Soon-jae
 Lee Sun-kyun
 Lee Sung-jae
 Lee Sung-jong
 Lee Sung-min
 Lee Sung-min
 Lee Sung-yeol
 Lee Tae-gon
 Lee Tae-hwan
 Lee Tae-min
 Lee Tae-ri
 Lee Tae-sun
 Lee Tae-sung
 Lee Wan
 Lee Won-jong
 Lee Won-keun
 Lee Yeong-hoon
 Lee Yi-kyung
 Lee Yong-woo
 Lee You-cheong
 Lee You-jin
 Lee Young-ha
 Leeteuk
 Leo
 Lim Ju-hwan
 Lim Seul-ong
 Lim Yoon-ho
 Loco

M 

 Ma Dong-seok
 Maeng Sang-hoon
 Maeng Se-chang
 Mahbub Alam Pollab
 Marco
 Mark Lee
 MC Mong
 Michael K. Lee
 Min Jin-woong
 Min Woo-hyuk 
 Mino
 MJ 
 Moon Bin 
 Moon Ji-hoo 
 Moon Ji-yoon
 Moon Jong-up
 Moon Joon-young 
 Moon Mason
 Moon Se-yoon
 Moon Sung-keun
 Moon Won-joo
 Moon Woo-jin

N 

 N
 Na Hyun
 Na In-woo
 Na Jae-min
 Na Tae-joo
 Na Woon-gyu
 Nam Da-reum
 Nam Doh-hyeong
 Nam Hyun-joon
 Nam Joo-hyuk
 Nam Tae-hyun
 Nam Woo-hyun 
 Nam Yeon-woo
 Nam Yoon-su
 Namkoong Min
 Namkoong Won
 Niel
 No Min-woo
 Noh Hong-chul
 Noh Jong-hyun
 Noh Woo-jin
 Noh Young-hak

O 

 O Yeong-su
 Oh Chang-seok
 Oh Dae-gyu
 Oh Dae-hwan
 Oh Dal-su
 Oh Eui-shik 
 Oh Jae-moo
 Oh Ji-ho
 Oh Jong-hyuk
 Oh Jung-se
 Oh Kwang-rok
 Oh Man-seok
 Oh Min-suk
 Oh Sang-jin
 Oh Se-hun 
 Oh Seung-hoon
 Oh Seung-yoon
 Oh Shin-hwan
 Oh Sung-won
 Oh Woo-jin 
 Ok Taec-yeon 
 On Joo-wan
 One
 Onew
 Ong Seong-wu

P 

 P.O
 Parc Jae-jung
 Park Ah-sung 
 Park Am
 Park Bo-gum
 Park Byung-eun
 Park Chan-dea
 Park Chanyeol 
 Park Chul-min
 Park Chul-soo
 Park Doo-shik 
 Park Eun-seok 
 Park Geon-il 
 Park Geun-hyung
 Park Gun-hyung
 Park Gun-woo
 Park Gwang-hyun
 Park Hae-il
 Park Hae-jin
 Park Hae-joon
 Park Hae-soo
 Park Hee-soon
 Park Hoon
 Park Hyo-jun
 Park Hyo-shin
 Park Hyuk-kwon
 Park Hyung-sik
 Park In-hwan
 Park Jae-jung
 Park Jeong-min
 Park Ji-bin
 Park Ji-hoon
 Park Ji-il
 Park Ji-woo
 Park Jin-young
 Park Jin-woo
 Park Jong-hwan
 Park Joong-hoon
 Park Jun-gyu
 Park Jung-bum
 Park Jung-chul
 Park Jung-min
 Park Ki-woong
 Park Min-woo
 Park Myung-hoon 
 Park No-sik
 Park Sang-hoon
 Park Sang-min
 Park Sang-myun
 Park Sang-won
 Park Sang-wook
 Park Seo-joon
 Park Seong-ho
 Park Shin-yang
 Park Si-hoo
 Park Si-hwan 
 Park Soo-young 
 Park Sun-ho
 Park Sung-hoon
 Park Sung-kwang
 Park Sung-woo
 Park Sung-woong
 Park Wan-kyu
 Park Won-sang
 Park Yeong-gyu
 Park Yong-ha
 Park Yong-woo
 Park Yoo-chun
 Park Yoon-jae
 Park Yu-hwan
 Psy
 Pyo Yeong-jae

R 

 Rain
 Ricky Kim
 Ren
 Rocky
 Roh Joo-hyun
 Rowoon
 Ryeoun
 Ryoo Seung-bum
 Ryoo Seung-wan
 Ryu Dam
 Ryu Deok-hwan
 Ryu Jin
 Ryu Jun-yeol
 Ryu Kyung-soo
 Ryu Seung-ryong
 Ryu Seung-soo
 Ryu Si-won
 Ryu Soo-young
 Ryu Tae-joon
 Ryu Ui-hyun

S 

 Samuel
 Sandeul
 Sean Richard Dulake
 Seo Do-young
 Seo Eun-kwang
 Seo Ha-joon
 Seo Hyun-chul
 Seo Hyun-woo
 Seo In-guk
 Seo In-seok
 Seo Ji-hoon
 Seo Ji-seok
 Seo Jun-young
 Seo Kang-joon
 Seo Kyung-seok
 Seo Min-woo
 Seo Woo-jin 
 Seo Young-joo
 Seol Jung-hwan
 Seungri 
 Seven
 Shim Hyung-rae
 Shim Hyung-tak
 Shim Ji-ho
 Shim Wan-joon 
 Shin Cheol-jin 
 Shin Dong-ho
 Shin Dong-woo
 Shin Dong-wook
 Shin Dong-yup
 Shin Goo
 Shin Ha-kyun
 Shin Hyun-joon
 Shin Hyun-soo
 Shin Jae-ha
 Shin Jung-geun
 Shin Jung-hwan 
 Shin Kang-woo
 Shin Ki-joon
 Shin Seong-il
 Shin Seung-ho
 Shin Seung-hwan
 Shin Sung-rok
 Shin Sung-woo
 Shin Won-ho
 Shin Yeon-shick
 Shin Young-kyun
 Shindong 
 Shownu 
 Simon Dominic
 So Ji-sub
 Sol Kyung-gu
 Son Byong-ho
 Son Chang-min
 Son Dong-woon 
 Son Ho-jun
 Son Ho-young
 Son Hyun-joo
 Son Ji-chang
 Son Jin-young
 Son Jun-ho
 Son Sang-yeon
 Son Suk-ku 
 Son Seung-won
 Son Won-il
 Son Woo-hyuk 
 Song Chang-eui
 Song Geon-hee
 Song Il-kook
 Song Jae-hee
 Song Jae-ho
 Song Jae-rim 
 Song Ji-ho
 Song Jong-ho
 Song Joon-seok
 Song Joong-ki
 Song Kang
 Song Kang-ho
 Song Kwang-won
 Song Sae-byeok
 Song Seung-heon
 Song Seung-hyun
 Song Won-geun
 Song Yuvin
 Steven Yeun
 Suho 
 Sung Dong-il
 Sung Hoon
 Sung Hyuk
 Sung Ji-ru
 Sung Joon
 Sung Si-kyung
 Sung Yoo-bin
 Sungha Jung
 Sunwoo Jae-duk

T

 T.O.P 
 Tablo
 Tae In-ho
 Tak Jae-hoon
 Tak Jae-in
 Tang Jun-sang
 Tei
 Teo Yoo 
 Thunder
 Tiger JK
 Tim
 Tony Ahn

U 

 U-Kwon
 Uhm Tae-goo
 Uhm Tae-woong
 Um Hyo-sup
 Um Ki-joon
 Um Sang-hyun
 Um Tae-hwa

V 

 V

W 

 Wang Seok-hyeon
 Wheesung
 Wi Ha-joon
 Won Bin
 Won Ki-joon
 Won Tae-hee
 Woo Do-hwan
 Woo Hyun
 Woo Ki-hoon 
 Woo Won-jae
 Wooseok

X 

 Xiumin

Y 

 Yang Byung-yeol
 Yang Dong-geun
 Yang Hak-jin
 Yang Hyun-suk
 Yang Ik-june
 Yang Kyung-won
 Yang Sang-guk
 Yang Se-hyung
 Yang Se-jong
 Yang Seung-ho
 Yang Seung-pil
 Yang Yo-seob 
 Yeo Hoe-hyun
 Yeo Hoon-min
 Yeo Hyun-soo
 Yeo Jin-goo
 Yeo One 
 Yeon Joon-seok
 Yeon Jung-hoon
 Yeon Woo-jin
 Yesung 
 Yim Pil-sung
 Yong Jun-hyung 
 Yoo Ah-in
 Yoo Byung-jae
 Yoo Dong-geun
 Yoo Eun-sook
 Yoo Gun
 Yoo Hae-jin
 Yoo Il
 Yoo Jae-myung
 Yoo Jae-suk
 Yoo Je-yoon
 Yoo Ji-tae
 Yoo Jun-sang
 Yoo Min-kyu
 Yoo Se-hyung 
 Yoo Seon-ho
 Yoo Seung-ho
 Yoo Seung-jun
 Yoo Su-bin
 Yoo Yeon-seok
 Yoo Young-jae
 Yook Sung-jae 
 Yoon Chan
 Yoon Chan
 Yoon Chan-young
 Yoon Da-hoon
 Yoon Do-hyun
 Yoon Doo-joon 
 Yoon Hee-seok
 Yoon Hyun-min
 Yoon Je-moon
 Yoon Ji-on
 Yoon Ji-sung
 Yoon Jong-bin
 Yoon Jong-hoon
 Yoon Jong-shin
 Yoon Joo-sang
 Yoon Kye-sang
 Yoon Kyun-sang
 Yoon Mun-sik
 Yoon Na-moo 
 Yoon Park
 Yoon San-ha 
 Yoon Sang-hyun
 Yoon Shi-yoon
 Yoon So-ho
 Yoon Sun-woo
 Yoon Tae-young
 Yu In-chon
 Yu Oh-seong
 Yugyeom
 Yunho

Z 

 Zizo
 Zo In-sung

See also

Korean drama
Contemporary culture of South Korea
List of people of Korean descent
List of North Korean actors

Actors
Actors